United Nations Security Council resolution 679, adopted unanimously on 30 November 1990, after considering a report by the Secretary-General regarding the United Nations Disengagement Observer Force (UNDOF), the Council noted its efforts to establish a durable and just peace in the Middle East.

The resolution decided to call upon the parties concerned to immediately implement Resolution 338 (1973), it renewed the mandate of the Observer Force for another six months until 31 May 1991 and requested that the Secretary-General submit a report on the situation at the end of that period.

See also
 Arab–Israeli conflict
 Golan Heights
 Israel–Syria relations
 List of United Nations Security Council Resolutions 601 to 700 (1987–1991)

References
Text of the Resolution at undocs.org

External links
 

 0679
 0679
Arab–Israeli peace process
 0679
1990 in Syria
November 1990 events